Andreas Kyprianou (born December 5, 1988) is a football striker, who plays for Othellos Athienou.

Career
Born in Larnaca, Kyprianou began playing youth football with Nea Salamina Famagusta FC at age 10. He was promoted to the first team and made 39 league appearances, scoring five goals, for the club.

He was signed by Anorthosis at age 21 in June 2010. He made his official debut with Anorthosis on December 1, 2010, in a cup match against Akritas. On January 25, 2011, he moved to Greece and signed a contract with Ionikos F.C. In June 2011, he moved to Omonia Aradippou and he became the top scorer in the 2011–12 Cypriot Second Division by scoring 13 goals in 23 appearances.
Next season (2012–13) Kyprianou scored 11 goals in playing in 19 matches.

In 2013–14 he moved to Anagennisi Dherynia again in the second division where he was the second goalscorer and the most productive striker of the league with 19 goals in 23 league matches.

In June 2014 he signed a contract with Enosis Neon Paralimni in order to help the team to return to the first division.

References

External links 
Profile at EPAE.org

1988 births
Living people
Cypriot footballers
Nea Salamis Famagusta FC players
Anorthosis Famagusta F.C. players
Ionikos F.C. players
Omonia Aradippou players
Aris Limassol FC players
Anagennisi Deryneia FC players
Enosis Neon Paralimni FC players
Cypriot expatriate footballers
Expatriate footballers in Greece
Cyprus under-21 international footballers
Association football forwards
People from Larnaca